The Boy in Blue may refer to:

The Boy in Blue (1919 film), a lost film directed by F. W. Murnau
The Boy in Blue (1986 film), a film starring Nicolas Cage

See also
The Boys in Blue, a 1982 British comedy film
Boy Blue (disambiguation)
Blueboy (disambiguation)